The United States Federal Budget for Fiscal Year 2002, was a spending request by President George W. Bush to fund government operations for October 2001-September 2002. Figures shown in the spending request do not reflect the actual appropriations for Fiscal Year 2002, which must be authorized by Congress.

Total Receipts

(in billions of dollars)

Total Outlays
Outlays by budget function
(in millions)

References

External links
 Status of Appropriations Legislation for Fiscal Year 2002

2002
2002 in American politics
United States federal budget